Black May is the name of two events in history.

Black May (1992) - The popular name for the 17–20 May 1992 popular protest in Bangkok against the government of General Suchinda Kraprayoon and the bloody military crackdown that followed.
Black May (1943) - A period (May 1943) in the Battle of the Atlantic campaign during World War II, when the German U-boat arm (Ubootwaffe) suffered high casualties with fewer Allied ships sunk.